William Forman may refer to:

William St. John Forman (1847–1908), U.S. Representative from Illinois
William Forman (mayor), Lord Mayor of London
Billy Forman, Neighbours character

See also
William Foreman, colonial American officer
Charles William Forman, educator